Portrait photography, or portraiture, is a type of photography aimed toward capturing the personality of a person or group of people by using effective lighting, backdrops, and poses. A portrait photograph may be artistic or clinical. Frequently, portraits are commissioned for special occasions, such as weddings, school events, or commercial purposes. Portraits can serve many purposes, ranging from usage on a personal web site to display in the lobby of a business.

History

The relatively low cost of the daguerreotype in the middle of the 19th century and the reduced sitting time for the subject, though still much longer than now, led to a general rise in the popularity of portrait photography over painted portraiture. The style of these early works reflected the technical challenges associated with long exposure times and the painterly aesthetic of the time. Hidden mother photography, in which portrait photographs featured young children's mothers hidden in the frame to calm them and keep them still, arose from this difficulty. Subjects were generally seated against plain backgrounds, lit with the soft light of an overhead window, and whatever else could be reflected with mirrors.

Advances in photographic technology since the daguerreotype spawned more advanced techniques, allowed photographers to capture images with shorter exposure times, and work outside a studio environment.

Lighting for portraiture

There are many techniques available to light a subject's face.

Three-point lighting
Three-point lighting is one of the most common lighting setups. It is traditionally used in a studio, but photographers may use it on-location in combination with ambient light. This setup uses three lights, the key light, fill light, and back light, to fully bring out details and the three-dimensionality of the subject's features.

Key light
The key light, also known as the main light, is placed either to the left, right, or above the subject's face, typically 30 to 60 degrees from the camera. The purpose of the key light is to give shape to and emphasize particular features of the subject. The distance of the key light from the camera controls the falloff of the light and profoundness of shadows.

Fill light
The fill light, also known as the secondary main light, is typically placed opposite the key light. For example, if the key light is placed 30 degrees camera-left, the fill light will be placed 30 degrees camera-right. The purpose of a fill light is to combat strong shadows created by the main light. Intensity of the fill light may be equal to the main light to eliminate shadows completely, or less intense to simply lessen shadows. Sometimes, the purpose of a fill light may be served by a reflector rather than an actual light.

Back light
The back light, also known as a hair light, helps separate a subject from its background and emphasize hair. In some cases, photographers may use a hair light to create lens flare or other artistic effects.

High-key and low-key lighting

High-key

High-key lighting is a technique used to result in an image that is mostly free of shadows and has a background brighter than the subject. High-key lighting typically involves use of all three lights (or more) in the three-point lighting setup.

Low-key

Low-key lighting is a technique used to result in an image where only part of the subject is lit, has dark shadows, and a background darker than the subject. Low-key lighting typically involves use of just one light in the three-point lighting setup (although sometimes two).

Butterfly lighting
Butterfly lighting uses only two lights. The key light is placed directly in front of the subject above the camera (or slightly to one side), and a bit higher than the key light in a three-point lighting setup. The second light (more often a reflector rather than an actual light) is placed as a fill directly below the camera (or slightly to the opposite side).

This lighting may be recognized by the strong light falling on the forehead, the bridge of the nose, the upper cheeks, and by the distinct shadow below the nose that often looks rather like a butterfly and thus, provides the name for this lighting technique.

Butterfly lighting was a favourite of famed Hollywood portraitist George Hurrell, which is why this style of lighting is often called Paramount lighting.

Other lighting equipment
Most lights used in modern photography are a flash of some sort. The lighting for portraiture is typically diffused by bouncing it from the inside of an umbrella, or by using a soft box. A soft box is a fabric box, encasing a photo strobe head, one side of which is made of translucent fabric. This provides a softer lighting for portrait work and is often considered more appealing than the harsh light often cast by open strobes. Hair and background lights are usually not diffused. It is more important to control light spillage to other areas of the subject. Snoots, barn doors and flags or gobos help focus the lights exactly where the photographer wants them. Background lights are sometimes used with color gels placed in front of the light to create coloured backgrounds.

Windowlight portraiture

Windows as a source of light for portraits have been used for decades before artificial sources of light were discovered. According to Arthur Hammond, amateur and professional photographers need only two things to light a portrait: a window and a reflector. Although window light limits options in portrait photography compared to artificial lights it gives ample room for experimentation for amateur photographers.  A white reflector placed to reflect light into the darker side of the subject's face, will even the contrast. Shutter speeds may be slower than normal, requiring the use of a tripod, but the lighting will be beautifully soft and rich.

The best time to take window light portrait is considered to be early hours of the day and late hours of afternoon when light is more intense on the window. Curtains, reflectors, and intensity reducing shields are used to give soft light. While mirrors and glasses can be used for high key lighting. At times colored glasses, filters and reflecting objects can be used to give the portrait desired color effects. The composition of shadows and soft light gives window light portraits a distinct effect different from portraits made from artificial lights.

While using window light, the positioning of the camera can be changed to give the desired effects. Such as positioning the camera behind the subject can produce a silhouette of the individual while being adjacent to the subject give a combination of shadows and soft light. And facing the subject from the same point of light source will produce high key effects with least shadows.

Styles of portraiture
There are many different techniques for portrait photography. Often it is desirable to capture the subject's eyes and face in sharp focus while allowing other less important elements to be rendered in a soft focus. At other times, portraits of individual features might be the focus of a composition such as the hands, eyes or part of the subject's torso.

Head shots have become a popular style within portrait photography, particularly in the entertainment industry, where they are commonly used to showcase an actor's or model's facial features and expressions.

Approaches to portraiture

There are essentially four approaches that can be taken in photographic portraiture—the constructionist, environmental, candid, and creative approach. Each has been used over time for different reasons be they technical, artistic or cultural.
The constructionist approach is when the photographer  constructs an idea around the subject. It is the approach used in most studio and social photography. It is also used extensively in advertising and marketing when an idea has to be put across.
The environmental approach depicts the subject in their environment. They are often shown as doing something which relates directly to the subject .  
The candid approach is where people are photographed without their knowledge going about their daily business. Whilst this approach taken by the paparazzi has been criticized, less invasive and exploitative candid photography has given the world important images of people in various situations and places over the last century. The images of Parisians by Doisneau and Cartier-Bresson demonstrate this approach. As with environmental photography, candid photography is important as a historical source of information about people.
The Creative Approach is where manipulation of the image is used to change the final output.

Lenses

Lenses used in portrait photography are classically fast, medium telephoto lenses, though any lens may be used, depending on artistic purposes. See Canon EF Portrait Lenses for Canon lenses in this style; other manufacturers feature similar ranges. The first dedicated portrait lens was the Petzval lens developed in 1840 by Joseph Petzval. It had a relatively narrow field of view of 30 degrees, a focal length of 150 mm, and a fast f-number in the ƒ/3.3-3.7 range.

Classic focal length is in the range 80–135 mm on 135 film format and about 150-400mm on large format, which historically is first in photography. Such a field of view provides a flattening perspective distortion when the subject is framed to include their head and shoulders. Wider angle lenses (shorter focal length) require that the portrait be taken from closer (for an equivalent field size), and the resulting perspective distortion yields a relatively larger nose and smaller ears, which is considered unflattering and imp-like. Wide-angle lenses – or even fisheye lenses – may be used for artistic effect, especially to produce a grotesque image. Conversely, longer focal lengths yield greater flattening because they are used from further away. This makes communication difficult and reduces rapport.  They may be used, however, particularly in fashion photography, but longer lengths require a loudspeaker or walkie-talkie to communicate with the model or assistants. In this range, the difference in perspective distortion between 85mm and 135mm is rather subtle; see  for examples and analysis.

Speed-wise, fast lenses (wide aperture) are preferred, as these allow shallow depth of field (blurring the background), which helps isolate the subject from the background and focus attention on them. This is particularly useful in the field, where one does not have a back drop behind the subject, and the background may be distracting. The details of bokeh in the resulting blur are accordingly also a consideration; some lenses, in particular the "DC" (Defocus Control) types by Nikon, are designed to give the photographer control over this aspect, by providing an additional ring acting only on the quality of the bokeh, without influencing the foreground (hence, these are not soft-focus lenses). However, extremely wide apertures are less frequently used, because they have a very shallow depth of field and thus the subject's face will not be completely in focus.

Conversely, in environmental portraits, where the subject is shown in their environment, rather than isolated from it, background blur is less desirable and may be undesirable, and wider angle lenses may be used to show more context.

Finally, soft focus (spherical aberration) is sometimes a desired effect, particularly in glamour photography where the "gauzy" look may be considered flattering. The Canon EF 135mm 2.8 with Softfocus is an example of a lens designed with a controllable amount of soft focus.

Most often a prime lens will be used, both because the zoom is not necessary for posed shots (and primes are lighter, cheaper, faster, and higher quality), and because zoom lenses can introduce highly unflattering geometric distortion (barrel distortion or pincushion distortion). However, zoom lenses may be used, particularly in candid shots or to encourage creative framing.

Portrait lenses are often relatively inexpensive, because they can be built simply, and are close to the normal range. The cheapest portrait lenses are normal lenses (50 mm), used on a cropped sensor. For example, the Canon EF 50mm f/1.8 II is the least expensive Canon lens, but when used on a 1.6× cropped sensor yields an 80mm equivalent focal length, which is at the wide end of portrait lenses.

Mobile portraiture
The documentary I Am Chicago was an experiment in mobile full-body portraiture, using natural light and a moving truck as a studio. The project aimed to break down traditional barriers of access to the art form.

Senior portraits

In North America, senior portraits are formal portraits taken of students near the end of their senior year of high school. Senior portraits are often included in graduation announcements or are given to friends and family. They are also used in yearbooks and are usually rendered larger than their underclassmen counterparts and are often featured in color, even if the rest of the yearbook is mostly reproduced in black and white. In some schools the requirements are strict regarding the choice of photographer or in the style of portraiture, with only traditional-style portraits being acceptable. Many schools choose to contract one photographer for their yearbook portraits, while other schools allow many different photographers to submit yearbook portraits. Senior portraits have become a cultural rite of passage in the United States, representing a momentous achievement in a young person's life and serving as a tangible reminder of their high school years for years to come.

Traditional
Formal senior portraits date back at least to the 1880s in America.
Some traditional senior portrait sittings include a cap and gown and other changes of clothing, portrait styles and poses.

In some schools a portrait studio is invited to the school to ensure all senior portraits (for the yearbook) are similar in pose and style, and so that students who cannot afford to purchase these portraits on their own or choose not to purchase portraits will appear in the yearbook the same as other students. Other schools allow students to choose a studio and submit portraits on their own.

Modern
Modern senior portraits may include virtually any pose or clothing choice within the limits of good taste. Students often appear with pets, student athletes pose in letterman jackets or their playing uniforms, and many choose fashion photography. Outdoor photos are popular at locations that are scenic or important to the senior. Picture proofs are usually available to view online the next day which are lower quality, unedited and often with a watermark of the studio.

See also
 Catchlight
 Mug shot
 Portrait photographers
 Selfie
 Street portrait

References

External links

 
Photography by genre